Philodromus emarginatus is a spider species with Palearctic distribution.

See also 
 List of Philodromidae species

References

External links 

emarginatus
Spiders of Europe
Palearctic spiders
Spiders described in 1803